Scaptius neritosia is a moth in the family Erebidae. It was described by E. Dukinfield Jones in 1908. It is found in Brazil.

References

Moths described in 1908
Phaegopterina